The men's competition in the lightweight  (– 69 kg) division was staged on November 22, 2009.

Schedule

Medalists

Records

Results

References
Results 

- Mens 69 kg, 2009 World Weightlifting Championships